XHPCPG-FM is a radio station on 98.1 FM in Chilpancingo, Guerrero. It is an owned-and-operated station of Grupo Imagen's Imagen Radio network.

History
XHPCPG was awarded in the IFT-4 radio auction of 2017 as one of two Chilpancingo frequencies in the auction. Grupo Imagen paid 2 million pesos. The station signed on in early 2019.

References

External links

Grupo Imagen
Radio stations in Guerrero
Radio stations established in 2019
2019 establishments in Mexico